Hat Town is the fourth studio album by Australian country musician, Lee Kernaghan. It was released in February 1998 and peaked at number 7 on the ARIA charts. The album was certified platinum in 1999

Hat Town won Album of the Year at the 1999 Country Music Awards of Australia.

Track listing
 "Hat Town"
 "Bare Essentials"
 "Goondiwindi Moon"
 "A Few of Us Left"
 "When the Snow Falls On the Alice"
 "Changi Banjo"
 "Cowgirls Do"
 "Gettin' Gone"
 "Pass the Bottle 'Round"
 "The Western Beat"
 "Longreach"
 "Lonelyville"

Charts

Weekly charts

Year-end charts

Certifications

References

1998 albums
Lee Kernaghan albums